Minnesota State Highway 58 (MN 58) is a  highway in southeast Minnesota, which runs from its interchange with U.S. 52 / State Highway 60 (co-signed) in Zumbrota and continues north to its northern terminus at its intersection with U.S. Highway 61 in Red Wing.

Route description
Highway 58 serves as a northeast–southwest route in southeast Minnesota between Zumbrota and Red Wing.

The roadway passes through the Richard J. Dorer State Forest between Red Wing and Hay Creek.

In the city of Red Wing, Highway 58 follows Plum Street and Bush Street.

The route is also known as Main Street in Zumbrota.

U.S. Highway 63 is concurrent with Highway 58 for one block between 3rd Street and Main Street (U.S. Highway 61) in Red Wing.

The route has one climbing lane for slow vehicles in the southbound direction, between County State Aid Highway 3 and County State Aid Highway 4.

The route is legally defined as Constitutional Route 58 in the Minnesota Statutes.

History
Highway 58 was authorized in 1920.

The route was completely paved by 1940.

Major intersections

References

058
Transportation in Goodhue County, Minnesota